Cymbula oculus is a species of sea snail, a true limpet, a marine gastropod mollusk in the family Patellidae, one of the families of true limpets.

Description

The shell is low, and a dull brown on the outside. It has about 10 major ribs. The margin of the interior is broad and black, with a light pinkish brown centre. Juveniles are yellow with iridescent green flecks. Attains up to 100mm length.

Distribution

South coast of South Africa.

Habitat
Inhabits the rocky mid-shore zone.

Biology
Protandrous hermaphrodite, changing to female at about 2 to 3 years. Consumes algae, and large individuals defend themselves by clamping down their shell edges on the predators. Commensal flatworm  Notoplana patellarum lives in the gill cavity under the shell. Harvested for food in the Transkei (Eastern Cape).

References

External links

Patellidae
Gastropods described in 1778
Taxa named by Ignaz von Born